Waddington Mwayenga (born 20 June 1984) is a Zimbabwean cricketer. He is primarily a medium pace bowler and plays his county cricket for Worcestershire 2nd XI. Waddington spents summer playing at Nottinghamshire Cricket Club, Radcliffe-On-Trent, and has moved on to Australia for the winter before being expected to return to England for summer.

His Test debut came in the second Test against Indian cricket team in 2005/06.

1984 births
Living people
Mashonaland cricketers
Masvingo cricketers
Zimbabwe One Day International cricketers
Zimbabwe Test cricketers
Zimbabwean cricketers
Zimbabwean cricket coaches